The 1946 Pontypool by-election was held on 23 July 1946.  The byelection was held due to the death of the incumbent Labour MP, Arthur Jenkins.  It was won by the Labour candidate Granville West.

References

Pontypool by-election
Pontypool by-election, 1946
Elections in Monmouthshire
Pontypool by-election
Pontypool, 1946
Pontypool by-election, 1946
Pontypool by-election